The Woman Cop is a 1980 French film directed by Yves Boisset.

Plot
A young and headstrong policewoman clashes with her superiors in Paris and is transferred to a small town. There she is assigned to secretarial work and
given an unimportant investigation in the eyes of the local chief of police. The investigation leads her to uncover a network of child prostitution
run by the most important family of the town. She struggles with the chief of police and the prosecutor to indict the members of the family but they refuse to back her and move forward against such powerful people. She is forced to resign from the police and the film ends with her in a taxi with her bags on the way to the train station.

Cast and roles
 Miou-Miou - Inspector Corinne Levasseur
 Jean-Marc Thibault - Commissaire Porel
 Leny Escudéro - Diego Cortez
 Jean-Pierre Kalfon - Backmann, the director of the MJC
 François Simon - Doctor Godiveau
 Alex Lacast - Inspector Simbert
 Niels Arestrup - Dominique Allier, the photographer
 Henri Garcin - Le procureur
 Philippe Caubère - Abbot Henning
 Roland Amstutz - M. Muller
 Roland Bertin - Substitut Berthot
 Roland Blanche - Inspector Roc
 Stéphane Bouy - Commissaire Bonnard
 Philippe Brizard - Juge d'instruction in the South
 Gérard Caillaud - Juge d'instruction in the North

References

External links
 IMDb entry

1980 films
French thriller films
Police detective films
1980s French-language films
Films directed by Yves Boisset
Films scored by Philippe Sarde
1980s French films